Şuhut District is a district of Afyonkarahisar Province of Turkey. Its seat is the town Şuhut. Its area is 1,044 km2, and its population is 36,309 (2021).

Composition
There are two municipalities in Şuhut District:
 Karaadilli 
 Şuhut

There are 36 villages in Şuhut District:

 Ağzıkara 
 Akyuva 
 Anayurt 
 Arızlı 
 Atlıhisar 
 Aydın 
 Bademli 
 Balçıkhisar 
 Başören 
 Bozan 
 Çakırözü 
 Çobankaya 
 Dadak 
 Demirbel 
 Efe 
 Güneytepe 
 Hallaç 
 İcikli 
 İlyaslı 
 İsalı
 Karacaören 
 Karahallı 
 Karlık 
 Kavaklı 
 Kayabelen 
 Kılınçkaya 
 Koçyatağı 
 Kulak 
 Mahmutköy 
 Ortapınar 
 Oynağan 
 Paşacık 
 Senir 
 Tekke 
 Uzunpınar 
 Yarışlı

References

External links
 District governor's official website 

Districts of Afyonkarahisar Province